Chaco Culture National Historical Park is a United States National Historical Park in the American Southwest hosting a concentration of pueblos. The park is located in northwestern New Mexico, between Albuquerque and Farmington, in a remote canyon cut by the Chaco Wash. Containing the most sweeping collection of ancient ruins north of Mexico, the park preserves one of the most important pre-Columbian cultural and historical areas in the United States.

Between AD 900 and 1150, Chaco Canyon was a major center of culture for the Ancestral Puebloans. Chacoans quarried sandstone blocks and hauled timber from great distances, assembling fifteen major complexes that remained the largest buildings ever built in North America until the 19th century. Evidence of archaeoastronomy at Chaco has been proposed, with the "Sun Dagger" petroglyph at Fajada Butte a popular example. Many Chacoan buildings may have been aligned to capture the solar and lunar cycles, requiring generations of astronomical observations and centuries of skillfully coordinated construction. Climate change is thought to have led to the emigration of Chacoans and the eventual abandonment of the canyon, beginning with a fifty-year drought commencing in 1130.

Comprising a UNESCO World Heritage Site located in the arid and sparsely populated Four Corners region, the Chacoan cultural sites are fragile—concerns of erosion caused by tourists have led to the closure of Fajada Butte to the public. The sites are considered sacred ancestral homelands by the Hopi and Pueblo people, who maintain oral accounts of their historical migration from Chaco and their spiritual relationship to the land. Although park preservation efforts can conflict with native religious beliefs, tribal representatives work closely with the National Park Service to share their knowledge and respect the heritage of the Chacoan culture.

The park is on the Trails of the Ancients Byway, one of the designated New Mexico Scenic Byways.

Geography 
Chaco Canyon lies within the San Juan Basin, atop the vast Colorado Plateau, surrounded by the Chuska Mountains to the west, the San Juan Mountains to the north, and the San Pedro Mountains to the east. Ancient Chacoans drew upon dense forests of oak, piñon, ponderosa pine, and juniper to obtain timber and other resources. The canyon itself, located within lowlands circumscribed by dune fields, ridges, and mountains, is aligned along a roughly northwest-to-southeast axis and is rimmed by flat massifs known as mesas. Large gaps between the southwestern cliff faces—side canyons known as rincons—were critical in funneling rain-bearing storms into the canyon and boosting local precipitation levels.

The canyon's main aquifers were too deep to be of use to ancient Chacoans: only several smaller and shallower sources supported the small springs that sustained them. Today, aside from occasional storm runoff coursing through arroyos, substantial surface water—springs, pools, wells—is virtually nonexistent.

Geology 

After the Pangaean supercontinent sundered during the Cretaceous period, the region became part of a shifting transition zone between a shallow inland sea—the Western Interior Seaway—and a band of plains and low hills to the west. A sandy and swampy coastline oscillated east and west, alternately submerging and uncovering the area atop the present Colorado Plateau that Chaco Canyon now occupies.

The Chaco Wash flowed across the upper strata of what is now the  Chacra Mesa, cutting into it and gouging out a broad canyon over the course of millions of years. The mesa comprises sandstone and shale formations dating from the Late Cretaceous, which are of the Mesaverde Group. The canyon and mesa lie within the "Chaco Core"—which is distinct from the wider Chaco Plateau, a flat region of grassland with infrequent stands of timber.

Climate 

An arid region of high xeric scrubland and desert steppe, the canyon and wider basin average  of rainfall annually; the park averages . Chaco Canyon lies on the leeward side of extensive mountain ranges to the south and west, resulting in a rainshadow effect that fosters the prevailing lack of moisture in the region. The region sees four distinct seasons. Rainfall is most likely between July and September, while May and June are the driest months. Orographic precipitation, which results from moisture wrung out of storm systems ascending the mountain ranges around Chaco Canyon, is responsible for most of the summer and winter precipitation, and rainfall increases with higher elevation.

The region averages fewer than 150frost-free days per year, and the local climate swings wildly from years of plentiful rainfall to prolonged drought. The heavy influence of the El Niño–Southern Oscillation contributes to the canyon's fickle climate.

Flora and fauna 
Chacoan flora typifies that of North American high deserts: sagebrush and several species of cactus are interspersed with dry scrub forests of piñon and juniper, the latter primarily on the mesa tops. The canyon is far drier than other parts of New Mexico located at similar latitudes and elevations, and it lacks the temperate coniferous forests plentiful to the east. The prevailing sparseness of plants and wildlife was echoed in ancient times, when overpopulation, expanding cultivation, overhunting, habitat destruction, and drought may have led the Chacoans to strip the canyon of wild plants and game. It has been suggested that even during wet periods the canyon was able to sustain only 2,000 people.

Among Chacoan mammals are the plentiful coyote (Canis latrans); mule deer, elk, and pronghorn also live within the canyon, although they are rarely encountered by visitors. Important smaller carnivores include bobcats, badgers, foxes, and two species of skunk. The park hosts abundant populations of rodents, including several prairie dog towns. Small colonies of bats are present during the summer. The local shortage of water means that relatively few bird species are present; these include roadrunners, large hawks (such as Cooper's hawks and American kestrels), owls, vultures, and ravens, although they are less abundant in the canyon than in the wetter mountain ranges to the east. Sizeable populations of smaller birds, including warblers, sparrows, and house finches, are also common. Three species of hummingbirds are present: one is the tiny but highly pugnacious rufous hummingbird, which compete intensely with the more mild-tempered black-chinned hummingbirds for breeding habitat in shrubs or trees located near water. Western (prairie) rattlesnakes are occasionally seen in the backcountry, although various lizards and skinks are far more abundant.

History

Archaic–Early Basketmakers 
The first people in the San Juan Basin were hunter-gatherers: the Archaic–Early Basketmaker people. These small bands descended from nomadic Clovis big-game hunters who arrived in the Southwest around 10,000 BC. More than 70 campsites from this period, carbon-dated to the period 7000–1500 BC and mostly consisting of stone chips and other leavings, were found in Atlatl Cave and elsewhere within Chaco Canyon, with at least one of the sites located on the canyon floor near an exposed arroyo. The Archaic–Early Basketmaker people were nomadic or semi-nomadic hunter-gatherers who over time began making baskets to store gathered plants. By the end of the period, some people cultivated food. Excavation of their campsites and rock shelters has revealed that they made tools, gathered wild plants, and killed and processed game. Slab-lined storage cists indicate a change from a wholly nomadic lifestyle.

Ancestral Puebloans 

By 900 BC, Archaic people lived at Atlatl Cave and similar sites. They left little evidence of their presence in Chaco Canyon. By AD 490, their descendants, of the Late Basketmaker II Era, farmed lands around Shabik'eshchee Village and other pit-house settlements at Chaco.

A small population of Basketmakers remained in the Chaco Canyon area. The broad arc of their cultural elaboration culminated around 800, during the Pueblo I Era, when they were building crescent-shaped stone complexes, each comprising four to five residential suites abutting subterranean kivas, large enclosed areas reserved for rites. Such structures characterize the Early Pueblo People. By 850, the Ancient Pueblo population—the "Anasazi", from a Ute term adopted by the Navajo denoting the "ancient ones" or "enemy ancestors"—had rapidly expanded: groups resided in larger, more densely populated pueblos. Strong evidence attests to a canyon-wide turquoise processing and trading industry dating from the tenth century. Around then, the first section of Pueblo Bonito was built: a curved row of 50 rooms near its present north wall. Archaeogenomic analysis of the mitochondria of nine skeletons from high-status graves in Pueblo Bonito determined that members of an elite matriline were interred here for approximately 330 years between 800 and 1130, suggesting continuity with the matrilineal succession practices of many Pueblo nations today.

The cohesive Chacoan system began unravelling around 1140, perhaps triggered by an extreme fifty-year drought that began in 1130; chronic climatic instability, including a series of severe droughts, again struck the region between 1250 and 1450. Outlying communities began to depopulate and, by the end of the century, the buildings in the central canyon had been neatly sealed and abandoned.

Some scholars suggest that violence and warfare, perhaps involving cannibalism, impelled the evacuations. Hints of such include dismembered bodies—dating from Chacoan times—found at two sites within the central canyon. Yet Chacoan complexes showed little evidence of being defended or defensively sited high on cliff faces or atop mesas. Only several minor sites at Chaco have evidence of the large-scale burning that would suggest enemy raids. Archaeological and cultural evidence leads scientists to believe people from this region migrated south, east, and west into the valleys and drainages of the Little Colorado River, the Rio Puerco, and the Rio Grande. Anthropologist Joseph Tainter deals at length with the structure and decline of Chaco civilization in his 1988 study The Collapse of Complex Societies.

Athabaskan succession 

Numic-speaking peoples, such as the Ute and Shoshone, were present on the Colorado Plateau beginning in the 12th century. Nomadic Southern Athabaskan-speaking peoples, such as the Apache and Navajo, succeeded the Pueblo people in this region by the 15th century. In the process, they acquired Chacoan customs and agricultural skills. Ute tribal groups also frequented the region, primarily during hunting and raiding expeditions. The modern Navajo Nation lies west of Chaco Canyon, and many Navajo live in surrounding areas.

Excavation and protection 
The first documented trip through Chaco Canyon was an 1823 expedition led by New Mexican governor José Antonio Vizcarra when the area was under Mexican rule. He noted several large ruins in the canyon.
The American trader Josiah Gregg wrote about the ruins of Chaco Canyon, referring in 1832 to Pueblo Bonito as "built of fine-grit sandstone". In 1849, a U.S. Army detachment passed through and surveyed the ruins, following United States acquisition of the Southwest with its victory in the Mexican War in 1848. The canyon was so remote, however, that it was scarcely visited over the next 50 years. After brief reconnaissance work by Smithsonian scholars in the 1870s, formal archaeological work began in 1896 when a party from the American Museum of Natural History based in New York City—the Hyde Exploring Expedition—began excavating Pueblo Bonito. Spending five summers in the region, they sent more than 60,000 artifacts back to New York and operated a series of trading posts in the area.

In 1901 Richard Wetherill, who had worked for the Hyde expedition, claimed a homestead of  that included Pueblo Bonito, Pueblo del Arroyo, and Chetro Ketl. While investigating Wetherill's land claim, federal land agent Samuel J. Holsinger detailed the physical setting of the canyon and the sites, noted prehistoric road segments and stairways above Chetro Ketl, and documented prehistoric dams and irrigation systems. His report went unpublished and unheeded. It urged the creation of a national park to safeguard Chacoan sites.

The next year, Edgar Lee Hewett, president of New Mexico Normal University (later renamed New Mexico Highlands University), mapped many Chacoan sites. Hewett and others helped enact the Federal Antiquities Act of 1906, the first U.S. law to protect relics; it was, in effect, a direct consequence of Wetherill's controversial activities at Chaco. The Act also authorized the President to establish national monuments: on March 11, 1907, Theodore Roosevelt proclaimed Chaco Canyon National Monument. Wetherill relinquished his land claims.

In 1920, the National Geographic Society began an archaeological examination of Chaco Canyon and appointed Neil Judd, then 32, to head the project. After a reconnaissance trip that year, Judd proposed to excavate Pueblo Bonito, the largest ruin at Chaco. Beginning in 1921, Judd spent seven field seasons at Chaco. Living and working conditions were spartan at best. In his memoirs, Judd noted dryly that "Chaco Canyon has its limitations as a summer resort". By 1925, Judd's excavators had removed 100,000 short tons of overburden, using a team of "35 or more Indians, ten white men, and eight or nine horses". Judd's team found only 69 hearths in the ruin, a puzzling discovery as winters are cold at Chaco. Judd sent A. E. Douglass more than 90 specimens for tree-ring dating, then in its infancy. At that time, Douglass had only a "floating" chronology. it was not until 1929 that a Judd-led team found the "missing link". Most of the beams used at Chaco were cut between 1033 and 1092, the height of construction there.

In 1949, the University of New Mexico deeded over adjoining lands to form an expanded Chaco Canyon National Monument. In return, the university maintained scientific research rights to the area. By 1959, the National Park Service had constructed a park visitor center, staff housing, and campgrounds. As a historic property of the National Park Service, the National Monument was listed on the National Register of Historic Places on October 15, 1966. In 1971, researchers Robert Lister and James Judge established the "Chaco Center", a division for cultural research that functioned as a joint project between the University of New Mexico and the National Park Service. A number of multi-disciplinary research projects, archaeological surveys, and limited excavations began during this time. The Chaco Center extensively surveyed the Chacoan roads, well-constructed and strongly reinforced thoroughfares radiating from the central canyon.

The richness of the cultural remains at park sites led to the expansion of the small National Monument into the Chaco Culture National Historical Park on December 19, 1980, when an additional  were added to the protected area. In 1987, the park was designated a World Heritage Site by UNESCO. To safeguard Chacoan sites on adjacent Bureau of Land Management and Navajo Nation lands, the Park Service developed the multi-agency Chaco Culture Archaeological Protection Site program. These initiatives have identified more than 2,400 archeological sites within the current park's boundaries; only a small percentage of these have been excavated.

Management 

Chaco Culture National Historical Park is managed by the National Park Service, a federal agency within the Department of the Interior; neighboring federal lands hosting Chacoan roads are controlled by the Bureau of Land Management. In the 2002–03 fiscal year, the park's total annual operating budget was $1.434 million. The park has a visitor center, which features the "Chaco Collection Museum", an information desk, a theater, a book store, and a gift shop. Prior to the 1980s, archeological excavations within current park boundaries were intensive: compound walls were dismantled or demolished, and thousands of artifacts were extracted. Starting in 1981, a new approach, informed by traditional Hopi and Pueblo beliefs, stopped such intrusions. Remote sensing, anthropological study of Indian oral traditions, and dendrochronology—which left Chacoan relics undisturbed—were pursued. In this vein, the "Chaco American Indian Consultation Committee" was established in 1991 to give Navajo, Hopi, Pueblo, and other Indian representatives a voice in park oversight.

Current park policy mandates partial restoration of excavated sites. "Backfilling", or re-burying excavated sites with sand, is one such means. Other measures attempt to safeguard the area's ancient ambiance and mystique, such as the "Chaco Night Sky Program", which seeks to eliminate the effect of light pollution on the park's acclaimed night skies; under the program, some 14,000 visitors make use of the Chaco Observatory (inaugurated in 1998), park telescopes, and astronomy-related programs. The park was named a Gold-tier Dark Sky Park by the International Dark-Sky Association in 2013. Chacoan relics outside the current park's boundaries have been threatened by development: an example was the proposed competitive leasing of federal lands in the San Juan Basin for surface coal mining beginning in 1983. As ample coal deposits abut the park, this strip mining threatened the web of ancient Chacoan roads. The year-long "Chaco Roads Project" thus documented the roads, which were later protected from mining.

As archaeological significance extends beyond the park's boundaries, the United States Department of the Interior intends to withdraw a 10-mile buffer zone around the park from development.

Sites 
The Chacoans built their complexes along a  stretch of canyon floor, with the walls of some structures aligned cardinally and others aligned with the 18.6-year cycle of minimum and maximum moonrise and moonset.

Central canyon 

The central portion of the canyon contains the largest Chacoan complexes. The most studied is Pueblo Bonito. Covering almost  and comprising at least 650 rooms, it is the largest great house; in parts of the complex, the structure was four stories high. Pueblo Bonito is divided into two sections by a wall precisely aligned to run north–south, bisecting the central plaza. A great kiva was placed on either side of the wall, creating a symmetrical pattern common to many Chacoan great houses. The scale of the complex, upon completion, rivaled that of the Colosseum. Nearby is Pueblo del Arroyo, which was founded between AD 1050 and 1075 and completed in the early 12th century; it sits at a drainage outlet known as South Gap.

Casa Rinconada, isolated from the other central sites, sits to the south side of Chaco Wash, adjacent to a Chacoan road leading to a set of steep stairs that reached the top of Chacra Mesa. Its sole kiva stands alone, with no residential or support structures whatsoever; it did once have a  passageway leading from the underground kiva to several above-ground levels. Chetro Ketl, located near Pueblo Bonito, bears the typical 'D'-shape of many other central complexes. Begun between 1020 and 1050, its 450–550 rooms shared one great kiva. Experts estimate that it took 29,135man-hours to erect Chetro Ketl alone; Hewett estimated that it took the wood of 5,000 trees and 50 million stone blocks.

It shows strong evidence of construction and occupation by Pueblo peoples from the northern San Juan Basin. Its rectangular shape and design is related to the Pueblo II cultural group, rather than the Pueblo III style or its Chacoan variant. It contains 55 rooms, four ground-floor kivas, and a two-story cylindrical tower that may have functioned as a kiva or religious center. Evidence of an obsidian-processing industry was discovered near the village, which was erected between 1125 and 1130.

Pueblo Alto is a great house of 89 rooms located on a mesa top near the middle of Chaco Canyon,  from Pueblo Bonito; it was begun between AD 1020 and 1050 during a wider building boom throughout the canyon. The community was the center of a bead- and turquoise-processing industry that influenced the development of all villages in the canyon; chert tool production was common. Research at the site conducted by archaeologist Tom Windes suggests only a handful of families, perhaps as few as five to twenty, lived in the complex; this may imply that Pueblo Alto served a primarily non-residential role. Another great house, Nuevo Alto, was built on the north mesa near Pueblo Alto; it was founded in the late 12th century, a time when the Chacoan population was declining.

Outliers 
Another cluster of great houses lies in Chaco's northern reaches; among the largest is Casa Chiquita ("Small House"), a village built in the 1080s, when, in a period of ample rainfall, Chacoan culture was expanding. Its layout featured a smaller, squarer profile; it also lacked the open plazas and separate kivas of its predecessors. Larger, squarer blocks of stone were used in the masonry; kivas were designed in the northern Mesa Verdean tradition. Two miles down the canyon is Peñasco Blanco ("White Bluff"), an arc-shaped compound built atop the canyon's southern rim in five distinct stages between 900 and 1125. A nearby cliff painting (the "Supernova Platograph") may record the sighting of the SN 1054 supernova on July 5, 1054.

Initial probes revealed 72 ground-level rooms, with structures reaching four stories in height; one large circular kiva has been identified. Kin Nahasbas, built in either the 9th or 10th century, is sited slightly north of Una Vida, positioned at the foot of the north mesa. Limited excavation of it has taken place. Tsin Kletzin ("Charcoal Place"), a compound located on the Chacra Mesa and positioned above Casa Rinconada, is  due south of Pueblo Alto, on the opposite side of the canyon. Nearby is Weritos Dam, a massive earthen structure that scientists believe provided Tsin Kletzin with all of its domestic water. The dam worked by retaining stormwater runoff in a reservoir. Massive amounts of silt accumulated during flash floods would have forced the residents to regularly rebuild the dam and dredge the catchment area.

Deeper in the canyon, Una Vida ("One Life") is one of the three oldest great houses; construction began around 900. Comprising at least two stories and 124 rooms, it shares an arc or "D"-shaped design with its contemporaries, Peñasco Blanco and Pueblo Bonito, but has a unique "dog leg" addition made necessary by topography. It is located in one of the canyon's major side drainages, near Gallo Wash, and was massively expanded after 930. Wijiji ("black greasewood"), comprising just more than one hundred rooms, is the smallest of the great houses. Built between 1110 and 1115, it was the last Chacoan great house to be constructed. Somewhat isolated within the narrow wash, it is positioned  from neighboring Una Vida. Directly north are communities even more remote: Salmon Ruins and Aztec Ruins, sited on the San Juan and Animas Rivers near Farmington, were built during a thirty-year wet period commencing in 1100. Some  directly south of Chaco Canyon, on the Great South Road, lies another cluster of outlying communities. The largest, Kin Nizhoni, stands atop a  mesa surrounded by marshy bottomlands.

Casamero Pueblo is located on McKinley County Road 19, near Tecolote Mesa, a red sandstone mesa. It was connected to its nearby outlier, Andrews Ranch, by a Chacoan road. Chaco Canyon, Aztec Ruins, Salmon Ruins, and Casamero Pueblo are on the Trail of the Ancients Scenic Byway.

Ruins

Great houses 

Immense complexes known as "great houses" embodied worship at Chaco. The Chacoans used masonry techniques unique for their time, and their building constructions lasted decades and even centuries. As architectural forms evolved and centuries passed, the houses kept several core traits. Most apparent is their sheer bulk; complexes averaged more than 200 rooms each, and some enclosed up to 700 rooms. Individual rooms were substantial in size, with higher ceilings than Ancestral Puebloan works of preceding periods. They were well-planned: vast sections or wings erected were finished in a single stage, rather than in increments. Houses generally faced the south, and plaza areas were almost always girt with edifices of sealed-off rooms or high walls. Houses often stood four or five stories tall, with single-story rooms facing the plaza; room blocks were terraced to allow the tallest sections to compose the pueblo's rear edifice. Rooms were often organized into suites, with front rooms larger than rear, interior, and storage rooms or areas.

Ceremonial structures known as kivas were built in proportion to the number of rooms in a pueblo. One small kiva was built for roughly every 29 rooms. "T"-shaped doorways and stone lintels marked all Chacoan kivas. Although simple and compound walls were often used, great houses were primarily constructed of core-and-veneer walls: two parallel load-bearing walls comprising dressed, flat sandstone blocks bound in clay mortar were erected. Gaps between walls were packed with rubble, forming the wall's core. Walls were then covered in a veneer of small sandstone pieces, which were pressed into a layer of binding mud. These surfacing stones were often placed in distinctive patterns.

Uses 

The meticulously designed buildings composing the larger Chacoan complexes did not emerge until around AD 1030. The Chacoans melded pre-planned architectural designs, astronomical alignments, geometry, landscaping, and engineering into ancient urban centers of unique public architecture. Researchers have concluded that the complex may have had a relatively small residential population, with larger groups assembling only temporarily for annual ceremonies. Smaller sites, apparently more residential in character, are scattered near the great houses in and around Chaco. The canyon itself runs along one of the lunar alignment lines, suggesting the location was originally chosen for its astronomical significance. If nothing else, this allowed alignment with several other key structures in the canyon.

Turquoise was very important to the people of Chaco. Approximately 200,000 pieces of turquoise have been excavated from the ruins at Chaco Canyon, and workshops for local manufacture of turquoise beads have been found. The turquoise was used locally for grave goods, burials and ceremonial offerings. More than 15,000 turquoise beads and pendants accompanied two burials at Pueblo Bonito.

Around this time, the extended Ancestral Puebloan (Anasazi) community experienced a population and construction boom. Throughout the 10th century, Chacoan building techniques spread from the canyon to neighboring regions. By AD 1115 at least 70 outlying pueblos of Chacoan provenance had been built within the  composing the San Juan Basin. Experts speculate the function of these compounds, some large enough to be considered great houses in their own right. Some suggest they may have been more than agricultural communities, perhaps functioning as trading posts or ceremonial sites.

Thirty such outliers spread across  are connected to the central canyon and to one another by an enigmatic web of six Chacoan road systems. When necessary, the roads deploy steep stone stairways and rock ramps to surmount cliffs and other obstacles. Although their purpose may never be certain, archaeologist Harold Gladwin noted that nearby Navajo believe that the Anasazi built the roads to transport timber; archaeologist Neil Judd offered a similar hypothesis.

Archaeoastronomy

Sun Dagger 

Two whorl-shaped etchings near the top of Fajada Butte compose what is called the "Sun Dagger" petroglyph that is tucked behind the eponymous rock panels of the "Three-Slab Site". They are symbolically focal.

It consists of two spirals—one principal and one ancillary. The latter left-hand spiral captured both spring and fall equinoxes; its artifice was revealed by a descending spear of light, filtered through the slabs, that shone upon it and split it in two. The former and larger whorl to its right was lit by the titular "sun dagger", which bisected it through another interplay of slab and sunlight. Light struck it, brilliantly, as the summer sun attains its solstice midday peak. The Chacoans were said to be marking, as artist, "Sun Dagger" discoverer, and leading proponent Anna Sofaer puts it, "the middle of time". Each turn of the 9.25-turn large spiral was found to mark one year in the 18.6-year "lunar excursion cycle" of the rising mid-winter full moon. This record is kept by a slab-cast lunar shadow whose edge strikes in succession each ring. As the full "minimum moon" closest to the winter solstice rises, the shadow's edge precisely strikes the center of the larger spiral; it steps outward year by year, ring by ring, until it strikes the outermost edge of it during the full "maximum moon", again in mid-winter.

Fajada Butte bears five other petroglyphs—including a carving of a "rattlesnake", other spirals, and a rectangle—that are conspicuously lit by contrasts between sunbeams and shadows during equinoxes or solstices. Public access to the butte was curtailed when, in 1989, erosion from modern foot traffic was found to be responsible for one of the three screening slabs at the "Sun Dagger" site shifting out of its ancient position; the assemblage of stones has thus lost some of its former spatial and temporal precision as a solar and lunar calendar. In 1990 the screens were stabilized and placed under observation, but the wayward slab was not moved back into its original orientation.

Alignments 

Some parties have advanced the theory that at least 12 of the 14 principal Chacoan complexes were sited and aligned in coordination, and that each was oriented along axes that mirrored the passing of the Sun and Moon at visually pivotal times. The first great house known to evince fastidious proportioning and alignment was Casa Rinconada: the twinned "T"-shaped portals of its  radius great kiva were north–south collinear, and axes joining opposing windows passed within  of its center. The great houses of Pueblo Bonito and Chetro Ketl were found by the "Solstice Project" and the U.S. National Geodetic Survey to be sited along a precisely east–west line, an axis that captures the passage of the equinox sun. The lines perpendicularly bisecting their principal walls are aligned north–south, implying a possible intent to mirror the equinox midday. Pueblo Alto and Tsin Kletsin are also north–south aligned. These two axes form an inverted cross when viewed from above; its northbound reach is extended another  past Pueblo Alto by the ramrod-straight Great North Road, a pilgrimage route that modern-day Pueblo Indians believe to be an allusion to myths surrounding their arrival from the distant north.

Each lies on a path from the central canyon that is collinear with the passage and setting of the full mid-winter "minimum moon", which recurs every 18.6 years. Two other complexes that are less distant from Pueblo Bonito, Una Vida and Peñasco Blanco, share an axis collinear with the passage of the full "maximum moon". The terms "minimum" and "maximum" refer to the azimuthal extreme points in the lunar excursion cycle, or the swings in direction relative to true north that the setting full moon exhibits. It takes roughly 9.25 years for the rising or setting full moon nearest to winter solstice to proceed from its maximum azimuthal north, or "maximum extremum", to its southernmost azimuth, known as "minimum extremum".

Speculation regarding the reasons for the alignments have been offered:

Gallery

See also

 Oasisamerica
 Ah-Shi-Sle-Pah Wilderness Study Area
 Bisti/De-Na-Zin Wilderness
 Dune Dam
 Kasha-Katuwe Tent Rocks National Monument
 Bryce Canyon National Park
 List of archaeoastronomical sites by country
 List of the oldest buildings in New Mexico
 National Register of Historic Places listings in McKinley County, New Mexico

Notes

Citations

References

Sources

Further reading

External links

Official and academic
 
 

Imagery and travel
 

Other
 
 
 
 

Chaco Culture National Historical Park
Archaeological museums in New Mexico
Archaeological sites on the National Register of Historic Places in New Mexico
Buildings and structures in San Juan County, New Mexico
Canyons and gorges of New Mexico
Chaco Canyon
Historic districts on the National Register of Historic Places in New Mexico
Landforms of San Juan County, New Mexico
Museums in San Juan County, New Mexico
National Historical Parks in New Mexico
Native American history of New Mexico
Native American museums in New Mexico
Oasisamerica cultures
Parks in McKinley County, New Mexico
Parks in San Juan County, New Mexico
Pre-historic cities in the United States
Protected areas established in 1907
Puebloan buildings and structures
Religious places of the indigenous peoples of North America
National Park Service areas in New Mexico
World Heritage Sites in the United States
1907 establishments in New Mexico Territory
Ancestral Puebloans
National Register of Historic Places in San Juan County, New Mexico
National Register of Historic Places in McKinley County, New Mexico
Dark-sky preserves in the United States
National Historical Parks of the United States